Wilfrid John Harrington (born 1927 in Ireland) is an Irish Dominican priest.

From Eyeries (near Castletowribere), County Cork, Ireland, Harrington was educated at Newbridge College, County Kildare, before entering the Dominicans in St. Mary's Priory, in Cork. He studied philosophy at St. Mary's Tallaght before going to Rome. He studied theology at the Angelicum(Pontifical University of Saint Thomas Aquinas) in Rome and biblical studies in Jerusalem at the École Biblique.  He lectures in scripture at St. Mary's, The Priory Institute,  at the Milltown Institute of Theology and Philosophy, and at the Church of Ireland Theological College, all of which are in Dublin. He also teaches in summer schools in the United States, he has also lectured in Scripture at Maynooth College and Trinity College, Dublin.

Published works

 Mark: Realistic Theologian
 Matthew: Sage Theologian
 Luke: Gracious Theologian
 John: Spiritual Theologian
 Revelation
 The Path of Biblical Theology (1973)
 Key to the Bible (1974)

See also
 Dominicans in Ireland

References

1927 births
Living people
People from County Cork
20th-century Irish Roman Catholic priests
Irish Dominicans
People educated at Newbridge College
Pontifical University of Saint Thomas Aquinas alumni
20th-century Irish Roman Catholic theologians
Irish expatriates in Italy
Irish expatriates in Israel